The Pulse of Persia Iranian Rhythms - Global Influences is the sophomore studio album by Ramin Rahimi, released on June 29, 2010 through ARC Music. Ramin Rahimi is also the Drummer of Angband, a power metal/ progressive band.

Track list

Personnel 

 Ramin Rahimi - Drums, Daf, Tombak, Cajon
 Omid Nik Bin - Bass
 Farid Raoufi - Acoustic guitar
 Alireza Rahimani Fard - congas
 Reza Darband - santur and Barbat
 Pasha Hanjani - ney
 Houmaioun Poshtdar - kamancheh

External links 
ARC Music
 Ramin Rahimi on Facebook
Angband on Myspace
 Angband on Facebook

References 

2010 albums
Ramin Rahimi albums